Senator Edmunds may refer to:

Edward Perrin Edmunds (1925–1967), Maine State Senate
George F. Edmunds (1828–1919), U.S. Senator from Vermont
James M. Edmunds (1810–1879), Michigan State Senate
Paul C. Edmunds (1836–1899), Virginia State Senate